Manjeet Maan (also spelled as Manjit Maan) is an Indian film producer and director who works in Punjabi language films. She is the wife of noted singer-songwriter and actor Gurdas Maan, and is the owner of Sai Productions, a film production company based in Mumbai. She also acted in the film Gabhroo Punjab Da, opposite Maan. She made her directorial debut with Sukhmani: Hope for Life in 2010.

Filmography

References 

Year of birth missing (living people)
Indian women film directors
Living people
Punjabi-language film directors
Punjabi film producers
Best Costume Design National Film Award winners